Colours was a Filipino satellite television channel based in Mandaluyong. It was owned and operated by MediaQuest Holdings, a wholly owned subsidiary of the PLDT Beneficial Trust Fund through Cignal TV. Its programming was composed primarily of lifestyle, entertainment, children and reality shows, as well as airing local movies from Cignal Entertainment and independent film entries from CineFilipino festival. Colours ceased broadcasting on December 31, 2021.

Background
On May 5, 2012, TV5 Network launched three channels exclusive to the Cignal platform. Those were Hyper, Weather and Information Network (WIN) and Colours. The lattermost was created to house lifestyle and entertainment programs.

On March 18, 2017, at exactly 12 noon, Colours unveiled a new logo and slogan, as well as the launch of their new programming.

In 2019, original Colours programming like From Helen's Kitchen were made available to free-to-air viewers via TV5. This was in conjunction with the network's collaboration with Cignal TV to broadcast the latter's shows on free TV.

In August 2020, episodes of TV5-Cignal shows Usapang Real Life, Fit for Life, and Chika, Besh! are currently aired on Colours one day after being shown on TV5.

At the end of 2021, after 9 years of broadcasting, Colours stopped broadcast, while some of the programs which were broadcast on this channel are still seen on TV5, as well as other cable channels such as One News and One PH.

Final programming

Original programs
40 is the New 30 
Closet Confidential 
 Create 
 Discover Eats 
Empire TV
eXes and whYs with Pops and Martin
Fit for Life 
From Helen's Kitchen
Kiddie Cuisine
Louie O. Live with Robin Nievera
Lunch Out Loud 
Mind S-Cool 
MomBiz 
Mom Café 
Rated Korina  
Shotlist 
Usapang Real Life 
Workout From Home

Acquired/canned programs
Anthony Bourdain: Parts Unknown
Celebrity Scoop
Fashion Forward 
Films and Stars
Instaglamour 
M Countdown 
World of Movies

Movie blocks
CineFilipino Films
Movie Mania

Former programming

Original programs
Chika, Besh! 
Good Vibes with Paolo
Sunday 'Kada  
Sunday Noontime Live!

See also
TV5
Metro Channel
One News
One Sports
ETC (Defunct)
 Solar Flix
 PIE

References

External links
 

TV5 Network channels
Defunct television networks in the Philippines
Television channels and stations established in 2012
Television channels and stations disestablished in 2021
Television networks in the Philippines
Women's interest channels
English-language television stations in the Philippines
Cignal TV